Kurupuram, also known as Kuruvapur, Kurugadda, or Kurugaddi is a holy place associated with Shripad Shri Vallabha who is considered as first avatars (incarnations) of the deity Shri Dattatreya in Kali Yuga. This village is located on the banks of Krishna river in border of Telangana & Karnataka states, India. On the opposite bank of the river is Vallabhapuram belonging to Telangana state which is also sacred.

Religious importance
Shripad Vallabha stayed here most of his life. The religious significance of Kurupuram is duly mentioned in the book Shri Guru Charitra and other holy books associated with Shri Dattatreya. Shripad Vallabha did many leelas here. According to Gurucharitra, the people who visit Kurupuram will become free from all the problems and will be blessed with a healthy and prosperous life.

Notes

References 
 Shri Dattatreya Dnyankosh by Dr. P. N. Joshi (Shri Dattateya Dnyankosh Prakashan, Pune, 2000).
 Datta-Sampradyacha Itihas (History of Datta Sampradaya) by Dr. R. C. Dhere (Padmagnadha Prakashan, Pune).
  Sri Pada Charitra- Shankar Bhatt ( Submitted in Telugu Version by Sri Malladi Diskhitulu)
 Sankshipta Sripada Srivallabha Charitramrutam Parayana grantham (abridged by Smt Prasanna Kumari Telugu Version)
 SriPada Sri Vallabha Website - www.sripadavallabha.org
 SriPada Vallabha Miracles - www.sripadavallabhamiracles.com

External links
  Official website

Hindu goddesses